Sambucus peruviana is a species of tree in the family Adoxaceae. It is native to Central America and South America.

Description
Trees up to 8 m, irregular trunk. Leaves compound, with 7-9 ovate-oblong leaflets, margin serrate, acute apex, hairy underside. The inflorescences are cymes 18–22 cm long, with white fragrant flowers. The fruits are black berries 1.2 cm in diameter, with 3-5 seeds.

Distribution and habitat
Sambucus peruviana is found from Costa Rica and Panama down the Andes south to northwestern Argentina between 2800 and 3900 m of elevation.

Vernacular names
 (Colombia, Peru, Bolivia),  (Argentina),  (Quechua language).

Uses
The fruits can be made into jams, drinks, and wines. The leaves, flowers and fruits have medicinal properties; analgesic, antiinflammatory, antiseptic, sudorific. The wood is hard and resistant, used for construction, tools and making of quenas.

References

External links

peruviana
Flora of the Andes
Crops originating from Ecuador
Crops originating from Peru
Trees of Peru
Trees of Ecuador
Trees of Bolivia
Trees of Argentina
Trees of Colombia
Trees of Costa Rica
Trees of Panama
Yungas
Flora of the Southern Andean Yungas